Schinia albafascia is a moth of the family Noctuidae. It is found south-western Montana and Idaho, west to Oregon, south to central and southern California, east to Arizona, New Mexico and Colorado.

Adults are on wing from July to October.

The larvae feed on Ericameria nauseosa.

External links
Revision of the tertia species complex

Schinia
Moths of North America
Moths described in 1883